A Department of Human Services (DHS) or Ministry of Human Services (MHS) is a national or subnational umbrella agency which is responsible for providing public assistance programs to the population they serve. Various aspects or alternate names include social security, social affairs, human resources and welfare.

A social affairs department is often combined with the portfolio of health or labor.

Examples
Some examples include:
  Albania — Ministry of Labor, Social Affairs and Equal Opportunities
  Australia — Australia Department of Human Services
 — Department of Human Services (South Australia)
  Canada — Human Resources and Skills Development Canada
 Ontario — Ministry of Community and Social Services
  Colombia — Ministry of Social Protection (Colombia)
  Croatia — Ministry of Health and Social Welfare and Ministry of the Family, Veterans' Affairs and Intergenerational Solidarity
  Denmark — Ministry of Social Affairs
  Guyana — Ministry of Labour Human Services and Social Security
  Iceland — Ministry of Welfare
  India — Ministry of Tribal Affairs
  Indonesia – Ministry of Social Affairs 
  Ireland — Department of Social Protection
  Japan — Ministry of Health, Labour and Welfare
  Lebanon — Ministry of Social Affairs
  Netherlands — Ministry of Social Affairs and Employment
  New Zealand — Ministry of Social Development
  People's Republic of China — Ministry of Human Resources and Social Security
 Hong Kong — Labour and Welfare Bureau
  Philippines — Department of Social Welfare and Development
  Portugal — Ministry of Labour and Social Solidarity
  Saint Lucia — Ministry of Health, Human Services, Family Affairs & Gender Relations
  Sweden — Ministry of Health and Social Affairs
  United Kingdom — Department for Work and Pensions
 Northern Ireland — Department of Health, Social Services and Public Safety
  United States — United States Department of Health and Human Services
 Hawaii — Hawaii Department of Human Services
 Illinois — Illinois Department of Human Services
 Michigan — Michigan Department of Human Services
 North Carolina — North Carolina Department of Health and Human Services
 Oklahoma — Oklahoma Department of Human Services
 Oregon — Oregon Department of Human Services
 Pennsylvania — Pennsylvania Department of Human Services
 Vermont — Vermont Agency of Human Services

References

Lists of government ministries